Gladstone Waithe (1902 – 17 June 1979) was a Barbadian cricketer. He played in nine first-class matches for the Barbados cricket team from 1928 to 1941.

See also
 List of Barbadian representative cricketers

References

External links
 

1902 births
1979 deaths
Barbadian cricketers
Barbados cricketers
Place of birth missing